Blood and Thunder is a Mortiis EP. Written and recorded in one day, it was released by Primitive Art Records, as a limited edition of 500 numbered and signed copies.
It came on purple vinyl with a poster.

These 2 songs originally appear as "Intro/Outro" on the album Myst by the
German band Fermenting Innards. Mortiis wrote them for the band but later
decided to release them as a stand-alone release.

Track listing 

 "Blood and Thunder"   2:24  
 "Battles on Ice"      2:21

Mortiis albums
1996 EPs